Park High School may refer to:

 Park High School, Colne, in Lancashire, England
 Park High School (Racine, Wisconsin)
 Park High School (Cottage Grove, Minnesota)
 Park High School, Stanmore, in the London Borough of Harrow, London, England
 Park High School (Livingston, Montana), in Livingston, Montana, United States
 Park High School (Birkenhead), one predecessor of Birkenhead Park School, England

See also
 Allen Park High School